Jose Delgado may refer to:
 José Antonio Delgado (1965–2006), Venezuelan mountaineer
 José Augusto Delgado (born 1938), Brazilian judge
 José Delgado Saldaña (born 1978),  Mexican professional wrestler
 José Dimas Cedeño Delgado (born 1933), Panamanian Roman Catholic archbishop
 Jose de Espronceda y Delgado (1808–1842), Spanish poet
 José Manuel Mota Delgado (born 1957), Portuguese footballer
 José Manuel Rodríguez Delgado (1915–2011), Spanish professor of neurophysiology
 José María Delgado (1887–1978), Philippine Ambassador to the Vatican
 José Matías Delgado (1767–1832), Salvadoran priest and politician
 José Miguel Arroyo Delgado (born 1969), Spanish bullfighter
 Jose Ramon Gonzalez Delgado (born 1953), Cuban artist
 José Ramos Delgado (1935–2010),  Argentine footballer and manager
 José Raúl Delgado (born 1960), Cuban baseball player
 Juan José Martín Delgado (born 1949), Spanish football manager
 Gangbuster (DC Comics), fictional superhero